The Kodály Quartet is a string quartet founded in 1966 in Budapest, Hungary, originally as Sebestyén Quartet. In 1969, with the approval of the Ministry of Cultural Affairs of the Hungarian Republic, the quartet assumed its present name in honour of the Hungarian composer Zoltán Kodály.

The ensemble tours internationally, and has recorded the complete cycles of Haydn, Beethoven and Schubert for the Naxos label. Its discography exceeds sixty recordings, mainly for Naxos.

Members
The quartet's present members are:

 Attila Falvay  1st violin 	
 Ferenc Bangó  2nd violin 	
 Zoltán Tuska  viola 	
 György Éder  violoncello

Awards
 Ferenc Liszt Award (1970)
 Artist of Merit of the Hungarian Republic (1990)
 Bartók-Pasztory Award (1996)
 Classic CD Magazine's Best Chamber Music Release (1993)

Select Notable Reviews
 BBC Music Magazine's Pick of the Month, April 2000
 American Record Guide, July/August 2000
 Strad Magazine, February 2001
 MusicWeb UK, February 2001
 Gramophone, December 2002
 Classic Today,  June 2005
 The Penguin Guide to Compact Discs (several listings, including one "Rosette")

Sources
 Archives of the Ferenc Liszt Society
 Archives of the Order of Merit of the Hungarian Republic
 Archives of the Bartók-Pásztory Foundation
 Archives of the publishers of Classic CD Magazine
 Archives of the British Broadcasting Corporation, BBC Music Magazine
 The Penguin Guide to Compact Discs, 
 Archives of the Ferenc Liszt Music Academy in Budapest, Hungary
 Kodály Quartet entry in the German edition of Wikipedia
 Naxos discography

External links

Kodaly String Quartet homepage
Facebook: Kodály String Quartet

Musical groups established in 1965
Hungarian string quartets
Artists of Merit of the Hungarian People's Republic